Golden Age refers to a mythological period of primeval human existence perceived as an ideal state when human beings were pure and free from suffering.

Golden Age may also refer to:

 Golden age (metaphor), the classical term used as a metaphor for a period of perceived greatness; includes a list of various golden ages

Artworks
The Golden Age (painting), oil on panel painting by Jacopo Zucchi

Film and television
 Golden Age (1934 film), a Chinese film of 1934
 Golden Age (2006 film), an animated internet series later released as a film
 "Golden Age" (Torchwood), a radio episode of the TV series Torchwood
 Berserk: The Golden Age Arc, a 2010s film series based on a manga story arc of the same name
 Elizabeth: The Golden Age, a 2007 sequel to the 1998 film Elizabeth
 L'Age d'Or (The Golden Age), a 1930 surrealist movie by Luis Buñuel and Salvador Dalí

Literature

Novels and essays
 A Golden Age, a 2007 novel by Tahmima Anam
 The Golden Age (Grahame), an 1895 book by Kenneth Grahame
 The Golden Age (London novel), a 2014 novel by Joan London
 The Golden Age (Vidal novel), a 2000 novel by Gore Vidal
 The Golden Age (Wright novel), a 2002 novel in the Golden Oecumene trilogy by John C. Wright

Periodicals and comics
 The Golden Age (comics), a 1993 DC Comics limited series
 The Golden Age (newspaper), now The Queanbeyan Age, published in New South Wales, Australia
 Awake!, formerly The Golden Age, a magazine published by Jehovah's Witnesses
 The New Golden Age, a 2022-2023 DC Comics event

Plays
 The Golden Age (Nowra play), a 1985 play by Louis Nowra
 The Golden Age, a play by A. R. Gurney
 Golden Age, a 2009 play by Terrence McNally

Music
 The Golden Age (Shostakovich), a 1930 ballet by Dmitri Shostakovich
 Golden Age, a recording facility in Auckland run by Joel Little

Albums
 The Golden Age (American Music Club album), 2008
 The Golden Age (Bobby Conn album), 2001
 The Golden Age (Cracker album), 1996
 The Golden Age (Dizzy Wright album), 2013
 The Golden Age (The Legendary Pink Dots album), 1989
 The Golden Age (Woodkid album), 2013
 The Golden Age (Your Demise album), 2012

Songs
 "Golden Age" (song), a 2008 song by TV on the Radio
 "The Golden Age" (The Asteroids Galaxy Tour song), 2009
 "Golden Age", by Battle Beast from Battle Beast, 2013
 "Golden Age", by Midnight Oil from Capricornia, 2002
 "Golden Age", by Ray Stevens, 1973
 "A Golden Age", by The Waterboys from Fisherman's Blues, 2013 (25th Anniversary box set)
 "The Golden Age", by Beck from Sea Change, 2002
 "The Golden Age", by Terry Dene, 1958

Places
 Golden Age Lake, a man-made lake under construction in Turkmenistan

See also
 
 Golden Era (disambiguation)
 Golden Time (disambiguation)
 Golden Years (disambiguation)
 Dark Ages (disambiguation)